Telcom may refer to:
 Telephone company, a provider of telecommunications services, such as telephony and data communications
 Telcom (Ireland), a telecommunications company
 Telcom (Somalia), a telecommunications network operator
 Telcom (compander), a compression system for audio recordings
 telcom c4, a professional compander for audio noise reduction by Telefunken

See also 
 Telecom (disambiguation)
 Telekom (disambiguation)
 List of telephone operating companies